Agriculture in the United Kingdom uses 71% of the country's land area, employs 1% of its workforce (467,000 people) and contributes 0.5% of its gross value added (£11.2 billion). The UK currently produces about 60% of its domestic food consumption.

Agricultural activity occurs in most rural locations.  It is concentrated in the drier east (for crops) and the wetter west (for livestock). There are 216,000 farm holdings, which vary widely in size.

Despite skilled farmers, advanced technology, fertile soil and subsidies, farm earnings are relatively low, mainly due to low prices at the farm gate. Low earnings, high land prices and a shortage of let farmland discourage young people from joining the industry. The average (median) age of the British farm holder is about 60 (as of 2016).

Recently there have been moves towards organic farming in an attempt to sustain profits, and many farmers supplement their income by diversifying activities away from pure agriculture. Biofuels present new opportunities for farmers against a background of rising fears about fossil fuel prices, energy security, and climate change. There is increasing awareness that farmers have an important role to play as custodians of the British countryside and wildlife.

Overview

The total area of agricultural holdings is about 23.07 million acres (9.34 million hectares), of which about a third are arable and most of the rest is grassland. During the growing season about half the arable area is cereal crops, and of the cereal crop area, more than 65% is wheat. There are about 31 million sheep, 10 million cattle, 9.6 million poultry and 4.5 million pigs. About 70% of farms are owner-occupied or mostly so (perhaps with individual barns or fields let out), and the remainder are rented to tenant farmers. Farmers represent an ageing population, partly due to low earnings and barriers to entry, and it is increasingly hard to recruit young people into farming. The average farm holder is about 60 years old.

British farming is on the whole intensive and highly mechanised.  This approach is well-suited to the current distribution infrastructure, but can be less productive by area than smaller scale, diversified farming. The UK produces only 59% of the food it consumes.  The vast majority of imports and exports are with other Western European countries.

Farming is subsidised, with subsidies to farmers totalling more than £3 billion (after deduction of levies).

Regional variations

While there is little difference between farming practices in England, Scotland, Wales and Northern Ireland in places where the terrain is similar, the geography and the quality of the farmland does have an impact. In Wales, 80% of the farmland is designated as a "Less Favoured Area", and in Scotland the figure is 84%. "Less Favoured Area" means land that produces a lower agricultural yield, typically upland moors and hill farms, which explains the tendency to focus on sheep and sometimes dairy farming. In England, the eastern and southern areas where the fields are flatter, larger and more open tend to concentrate on cereal crops, while the hillier northern and western areas with smaller, more enclosed fields tend to concentrate on livestock farming.

History

Before 1500

Farming was introduced in the British Isles between about 5000 BC and 4500 BC after a large influx of Mesolithic people and following the end of the Pleistocene epoch. It took 2,000 years for the practice to extend across all of the isles. Wheat and barley were grown in small plots near the family home. Sheep, goats and cattle came in from mainland Europe, and pigs were domesticated from wild boar already living in forests. There is evidence of agricultural and hunter-gatherer groups meeting and trading with one another in the early part of the Neolithic.

The Saxons and the Vikings had open-field farming systems.  Under the Normans and Plantagenets fens were drained, woods cleared and farmland expanded to feed a rising population, until the Black Death reached Britain in 1349.  This and subsequent epidemics caused the population to fall; one-third of the population in England died between 1349 and 1350. In consequence, areas of farmland were abandoned.  The feudal system began to break down as labourers, who were in short supply following the plague, demanded wages (instead of subsistence) and better conditions.  Also, there were a series of poor harvests after about 1315, coinciding with some evidence (from tree rings) of poor weather across the whole of northern Europe, which continued on and off until about 1375.  The population did not recover to 1300 levels for 200 to 300 years.

1500 to 1750
When King Henry VIII named himself Supreme Head of the Church of England in 1531, he set about the dissolution of the monasteries, which was largely complete by 1540. This land was largely sold off to fund Henry's military ambitions in France and Scotland, and the main buyers were the aristocracy and landed gentry. Agriculture boomed as grain prices increased sixfold by 1650. Improvements in transport, particularly along rivers and coasts, brought beef and dairy products from the north of England to London.

Jethro Tull, a Berkshire farmer, invented his famous rotating-cylinder seed drill.  His 1731 book, The New Horse Hoeing Husbandry, explained the systems and devices he espoused to improve agriculture.  The book had such an impact that its influence can still be seen in some aspects of modern farming. Charles Townsend, a viscount known as "Turnip Townsend", in the 1730s introduced turnip farming on a large scale.  This created four-crop rotation (wheat, turnips, barley and clover) which allowed fertility to be maintained with much less fallow land.  Clover increases mineral nitrogen in the soil and clover and turnips are good fodder crops for livestock, which in turn improve the soil by their manure.

1750 to 1850

Between 1750 and 1850, the English population nearly tripled, with an estimated increase from 5.7 million to 16.6 million, and all these people had to be fed from the domestic food supply.  This was achieved through intensified agriculture and land reclamation from the Fens, woodlands, and upland pastures. The crop mix changed too, with wheat and rye replacing barley.  Nitrogen fixing plants such as legumes led to sustainable increased yields. These increased yields, combined with improved farming machinery and then-new capitalist ways of organising labour, meant that increased crop production did not need much more manpower, which freed labour for non-agricultural work.  Indeed, by 1850 Britain had the smallest proportion of its population engaged in farming of any country in the world, at 22%.

Farmers were one of the groups of society that contributed significantly to the numeracy revolution achieved in Europe during the early modern era. During the 18th century, a large share of farmers had the ability to basic numerical skills as well as the ability to read and write (literacy), both of which are skills that were far from widespread in the early modern period. This is unsurprising for countries such as England, where farmers developed particularly high human capital skills because of rapid occupational changes – they became a minority that produced the food for the majority of the population. One possible explanation for this phenomenon is the strong link between nutrition and cognitive abilities. A constant amount of nutrition was almost always available to farmer families, they could feed themselves even during times of famine by increasing the share of their products that they consumed themselves instead of selling them on markets.

Enclosures

Open fields divided among several tenants originally had the advantage of reducing risks by giving all farmers diverse soils and crops so no one faced famine when others prospered.  But the system was inefficient. Poor farmers got as much land as good farmers. By the 18th century enclosures came in poorer regions where several landholders were more willing to sell land. After 1760, though, parliamentary legislation permitted the enclosure of wealthier lands that had more complex structures of ownership. The result was an added £4 million to England's national income.

During the 18th and 19th centuries, enclosures were by means of special acts of Parliament. They consolidated strips in the open fields into more cohesive units, and enclosed much of the remaining pasture commons or wastes.  Enclosure consisted of exchange in land, and an extinguishing of common rights. This allowed farmers to consolidate and fence off their own large plots of land, in contrast to multiple small strips spread out and separated.  Voluntary enclosure was also frequent at that time.

At the time of the parliamentary enclosures, most manors had seen consolidation of tenant farms into multiple large landholdings. Multiple larger landholders already held the bulk of the land. They 'held' but did not legally own in today's sense. They also had to respect the open field system rights, when demanded, even when in practice the rights were not widely in use. Similarly each large landholding would consist of scattered patches, not consolidated farms. In many cases enclosures were largely an exchange and consolidation of land, and exchange not otherwise possible under the legal system. It did also involve the extinguishing of common rights. Without extinguishment, one man in an entire village could unilaterally impose the common field system, even if everyone else did not desire to continue the practice. De jure rights were not in accord with de facto practice. With land one held, one could not formally exchange the land, consolidate fields, or entirely exclude others. Parliamentary enclosure was seen as the most cost-effective method of creating a legally binding settlement. This is because of the costs (time, money, complexity) of using the common law and equity legal systems. Parliament required consent of the owners of 4/5-ths of the land (copy and freeholders).

The primary benefits to large land holders came from increased value of their own land, not from expropriation. Smaller holders could sell their land to larger ones for a higher price post enclosure. There was not much evidence that the common rights were particularly valuable. Protests against Parliamentary Enclosure continued, sometimes in Parliament itself, frequently in the villages affected, and sometimes as organised mass revolts. Voluntary enclosure was frequent at that time. Enclosed land was twice as valuable, a price which could be sustained only by its higher productivity.

Depression and prosperity

This peaceful period included a twenty-year depression in agriculture 1815 to 1836.  It was so severe that landlords as well as tenants suffered financial ruin, and large areas of farmland were entirely abandoned.  The ancient landlord and tenant system was unsuited to new-style, capital-intensive farms, which caused concern in Parliament.  Parliament began to improve the legislation, for example by distinguishing between farm improvements that the tenant should fund, and those the landlord should fund.

From 1836 until Parliament repealed the Corn Laws in 1846, agriculture flourished.  The repeal of the Corn Laws steadied prices, though agriculture remained prosperous.  At that time, Parliament was concerned with the issue of tenant right, i.e. the sum payable to an outgoing tenant for farm improvements that the tenant had funded and, if crops were in the ground when the tenant left, compensation for their value.  This was down to local custom which might vary from place to place.  In 1848 a parliamentary committee examined the possibility of a standardised system, but a Bill on the matter was not passed until 1875.

1850 to 1939

The American Civil War ended in 1865, and by 1875, with new steam-powered railways and ships, the United States was exporting a substantial excess of cereals.  At the same time, Britain suffered a series of poor harvests.  By 1891 reliable refrigeration technology brought cheap frozen meat from Australia, New Zealand and South America to the British market, and Parliament felt it had to intervene to support British farming.  The Agricultural Holdings (England) Act 1875 revamped the law on tenant right such that tenants received consistent levels of compensation for the value of their improvements to the holding and any crops in the ground.  It also gave tenants the right to remove fixtures they had provided, increased the period of a Notice to Quit from six months to twelve, and brought in an agricultural dispute resolution procedure.

Some Landlords reacted to the 1875 Act by refusing to let land on a tenancy, instead contracting out the labour to contract farmers.  Parliament responded with the Agricultural Holdings (England) Act 1883, which prevented contracting out on terms less favourable than a normal tenancy.  Subsequent Agricultural Holdings Acts in 1900 and 1906 further refined the dispute resolution procedure; required landlords to compensate tenants for their damaged crops if the damage was caused by game that the landlord did not allow tenants to kill; allowed tenants to choose for themselves what crops to grow, except in the last year of the tenancy; and prevented penal rents being charged except in special circumstances.  The mass of legislation was consolidated in another Act of 1908.  Further Agricultural Holdings Acts came into force in 1914, two in 1920, and a further consolidating Act in 1923.

Invented in around 1885, the digging plough is a plough with a wider share, which cuts a wider shallower furrow, after which the slice of soil is inverted by a short concave mould-board with a sharp turn.  This has the effect of breaking up and pulverising the soil, leaving no visible furrow and facilitating the use of a seed drill for planting.  Earlier ploughs were simply large hoes for stirring the soil, drawn by animals, that left furrows suitable for distribution of seed by hand.

The Board of Agriculture was established by Act of Parliament in 1889.  Although rationing during the First World War was limited to the end of 1917 and 1918, a change of mood arose about food security, and the Ministry of Food was created in 1916.  There was a national feeling that a man who had fought for his country should be entitled to retire to a smallholding on British land that would provide him with a livelihood.  This led to various initiatives, collectively called Homes for Heroes.  By 1926 agricultural law had become openly redistributive in favour of ex-servicemen. County Councils had compulsory purchase powers to requisition land they could let as smallholdings.  Ex-servicemen were the preferred tenants.  The tenant could then buy the land and could ask the Council to lend them money to fund the purchase as a mortgage.  The Council could not refuse without the Minister of Agriculture's permission.

In 1919 the Board of Agriculture and the Ministry of Food were merged to form the Ministry of Agriculture and Fisheries, which later became the Ministry of Agriculture, Fisheries and Food (MAFF).  MAFF was in turn the predecessor of DEFRA.

In 1938 88% of wheat was imported, 96% of butter, 76% of cheese and about half the eggs and meat.

1939 to 1945

Before the Second World War started, Britain imported 55 million tons of food a year.  By the end of 1939, this had dropped to 12 million, and food rationing was introduced at the start of 1940.  It did not completely end until July 1954.  The government tried to encourage people to grow their own food in victory gardens, and householders were encouraged to keep rabbits and chickens for the table.  There were 1.5 million allotments by 1943. Potatoes became "the food of the war".  Because so many men had been conscripted into the army, women were drafted in to work the land; they were called the Women's Land Army, or less formally, "land girls".

Famously, the Government responded to a temporary wartime oversupply of carrots by suggesting that the RAF's exceptional night-flying was due to eating carotene.  The ruse worked: consumption of carrots increased sharply because people thought carrots might help them see in the blackout, thus taking the pressure off other food supplies.  But with so much of the agricultural labour force fighting, pressure on food supplies worldwide increased throughout the war.  The government estimated that in 1945 world meat consumption would exceed supply by 1.8 million tons and that only wheat would be "available in abundance".  The Prime Minister suggested that if necessary, food supplies could take priority over supplies for the military, and considered the possibility of famine in the occupied territories after the war.

1945 to present
The Agriculture Act 1947 broadly revamped agricultural law.  It was a reaction to the privations of the Second World War, and was aimed at food security, so as to reduce the risk of a hostile foreign power being able to starve the UK into submission.  The Act guaranteed prices, markets and tenure, so that a farmer could be assured that his land would not be taken away and whatever he grew would be sold at a known price.  Yet another consolidating Agricultural Holdings Act followed it in 1948.  These Acts made it harder to evict tenant farmers.  With the new security tenants enjoyed, a system of rent reviews was necessary to take account of land price inflation.  There were many other changes in the law, and each of these Acts needed negotiations between the Ministry of Agriculture and the National Farmers Union (NFU) to fix the support price to be paid for each agricultural product.  They were enacted in a series of Agriculture (Miscellaneous Provisions) Acts in 1949, 1954, 1963, 1968 and 1972.

The Agriculture (Miscellaneous Provisions) Act 1976 was another far-reaching revamp of the law.  At the time it was passed, the Lib-Lab Pact of 1976 needed Plaid Cymru's support in Parliament, and the provisions of this Act were part of Plaid Cymru's price for their vote.  This Act allowed for succession of agricultural tenancies, so on a farmer's death, a relative with relevant skills or experience and no holding of his own could inherit the tenancy.  This was limited to two generations of tenant.

On government instructions, the Northfield Committee began to review the country's agricultural system in 1977.  It did not report until July 1979, by which time Margaret Thatcher's administration held power.  The report influenced ongoing discussions between the NFU and the Country Landowners Association (CLA), who were trying to reach an agreement on new Agricultural Holdings legislation that could be presented to Parliament as having industry-wide support.  This was agreed in 1984, but the two sides had not been able to agree a fundamental change to the security of tenure legislation.  It did change the succession rules for existing tenancies such that a farmer might pass on his tenancy on retirement as well as on death—but no new tenancies from 1984 were to include succession rights.

By this time the then-European Economic Community (now the European Community)'s Common Agricultural Policy and the value of the green pound was having a direct impact on farming.  The Agriculture Act 1986 was concerned with the value of the milk quota attached to land, and particularly how it ought to be shared between landlord and tenant. Nowadays, milk quotas no longer exist, but other subsidies (largely rolled up into Single Payments) still must be divided between the parties.

Politics and education

The National Farmers Union
The National Farmers Union (NFU) was begun by a group of nine Lincolnshire farmers and, as the "Lincolnshire Farmers Union", held its first meeting in 1904.  By 1908 they were called the National Farmers Union and were meeting in London.  During the Second World War, the NFU worked hand in glove with the Ministry of Agriculture to ensure food security.  Rationing continued after the war and it is a measure of the NFU's influence at that time that the Agriculture Act 1947 committed the government to undertake a national review of the industry every year in consultation with the NFU.

The close relationship between the NFU and the MAFF continued until New Labour reformed the MAFF into Defra in 2001, and indeed the MAFF was sometimes (if unfairly) called the "NFU's political wing".  Defra is seen as more independent, although the NFU does remain a powerful and effective lobbying body that wields considerable influence in proportion to the industry's economic value.

Agricultural colleges
The Royal Agricultural University, which was the first agricultural college in the English-speaking world, opened as the Royal Agricultural College in 1845. It was granted its royal charter shortly after its founding. By the latter half of the nineteenth century, as farming grew more complex and methodical and as productivity increased, there was a dawning recognition that farmers needed agricultural education.  Thanks to government financial support for agricultural education in the 1890s, the Royal Agricultural College was followed by Writtle College in 1893 and Harper Adams University College in 1901.  Meanwhile, the West of Scotland Agricultural College formed in 1899, the East of Scotland Agricultural College in 1901, and the North of Scotland Agricultural College in 1904; these colleges amalgamated to form the Scottish Agricultural College in 1990. Professor John Wrightson opened his private Downton Agricultural College in 1880; it closed in 1906 as it was unable to compete with the publicly funded state colleges.

Economics
Total income from farming in the United Kingdom was £5.38 billion in 2014, representing about 0.7% of the British national value added in that year.  This is a fall of 4.4% in real terms since 2014.  Earnings were £30,900 per full-time person in 2011, which represented an increase of 24% from 2010 values in real terms.  This was the best performance in UK agriculture since the 1990s.  Agriculture employs 476,000 people, representing 1.5% of the workforce, down more than 32% since 1996. In terms of gross value added in 2009, 83% of the UK's agricultural income originated from England, 9% from Scotland, 4% from Northern Ireland and 3% from Wales.

The top twenty agricultural products of the United Kingdom by value as reported by the Food and Agriculture Organization in 2012 (volume in metric tons):
{| class="wikitable"
|1.
|Milk (cow)
|13,884,000
|-
|2.
|Wheat 
|13,261,000
|-
|3.
|Chicken meat	
|1,396,830
|-
|4.
|Cattle meat
|882,000
|-
|5.
|Pig meat
|770,150
|-
|6.
|Sheep meat
|285,000
|-
|7.
|Potatoes
|4,553,000
|-
|8.
|Rapeseed
|2,557,000
|-
|9.
|Hen eggs
|630,000
|-
|10.
|Sugar beet
|7,291,000
|-
|11.
|Turkey meat
|201,348
|-
|12.
|Barley
|5,522,000
|-
|13.
|Carrots and turnips
|663,700
|-
|14.
|Mushrooms and truffles
|73,100
|-
|15.
|Wool, grease
|68,000
|-
|16.
|Strawberries
|95,700
|-
|17,
|Apples
|202,900
|-
|18.
|Onions
|373,610
|-
|19.
|Lettuce and chicory
|122,000
|-
|20.
|Duck meat
|32,101
|}

Most farmers of beef cattle or sheep made another net loss in the year to April 2010.  Production, veterinary, bedding, property, power and machinery costs all underwent double-digit rises in percentage terms, meaning that the losses in the year to April 2010 increased over last year's losses by over £30/animal.  However, wheat exports were much stronger than the previous year.

The UK's egg-laying flock is in decline. It fell by 5.5% in one year from June 1999 to May 2000. In 1971, there were 125,258 farms with egg-laying hens and by 1999 this was down to 26,500.

Subsidies
When in the EU, UK farmers received more than £3 billion a year via the Single Farm Payment. This is roughly £28,300 per farm, although this includes around £3,000 of environmental subsidies, such as for planting woodland. Following Brexit a new subsidy scheme is being introduced with a proposed reduction in direct payments with an increase in payments tied to specific environmental or developmental criteria.

Land

The agricultural area used is 23.07 million acres (9.34 million hectares), about 70% of the land area of England. 36% of the agricultural land is croppable (arable), or 25% of the total land area.  Most of the rest is grassland, rough grazing, or woodland.

Soil is a complex mix of mineral and organic components, produced when rock is weathered and acted on by living organisms.  Most British soils are 2% to 5% organic and 95% to 98% mineral, but soils such as peat may contain up to 50% organic matter.  In the British Isles as far south as the Thames Valley, the soil has been heavily glaciated, which not only ground down the rock but redistributed the resulting matter.  As a result, most British soils date from the last ice age and are comparatively young, but in level areas and particularly south of the Thames Valley, there are much older soils.

Many British soils are quite acidic, and a large proportion of British farm land needs repeated applications of alkalines (traditionally lime) to remain fertile.  Nitrites are soluble, so rain rapidly carries them away. Acid rain increases soil acidity, but even normal rain tends to be slightly acid, increasing the natural acidity of British soil. Rainfall in Britain exceeds the rate of evaporation.  This means that in freely drained areas, soil base material is washed away, which leads to a higher concentration of organic acids in the ground.  This relatively high soil acidity is one of the factors that lead to liming.  Lime tends to counteract soil acidity, and with fine particulate soils such as clays, also encourages the formation of a better soil crumb structure that will aerate and help with drainage.  Its benefits have been known, if not scientifically understood, since Roman times.

Soffe (2003) summarises the acidity of British soils as follows:-

{| class="sortable wikitable"
! Land type !! pH
|-
| Sandy heath land || 3.5–5.0
|-
| Calcareous (chalky) brown soil || 6.5–8.0
|-
| Upland peat || 3.5–4.5
|-
| Cultivated soil, non-calcareous || 5.0–7.0
|-
| Cultivated soil, calcareous || 7.0–8.0
|-
| Permanent pasture, lowland || 5.0–6.0
|-
| Permanent pasture, upland || 4.5–5.5
|-
| Lowland peat || 4.0–7.0
|}

Owing to high rainfall in the UK, less freely drained areas tend to become waterlogged.  Wet land may be unable to bear a tractor's weight, and drainage makes soil lighter and more easily worked, improves crops' ability to absorb food because there is more root surface area, stimulates helpful micro-organisms and allows accumulated poisons to be carried away. In Britain field drains are traditionally open ditches, but increasingly, covered pipes have been used in more modern times. Earthworms are important for creating small drainage channels in the soil and helping to move soil particles.

No appreciable plant growth takes place at temperatures below 4 °C.  The growth rate increases as temperature rises, up to a maximum limit which is of no relevance to the British Isles.  Dark soils tend to absorb more heat, and are therefore preferred.

As crops grow, they absorb nutrients from the soil, so land fertility degrades over time.  However, if organic matter poor in nitrogen but rich in carbohydrate is added to the soil, nitrogen is assimilated and fixed.  Fertility increases while land is under grass, which helps to accumulate organic matter in the soil. These factors mean that soil is traditionally improved by means of liming, draining, and allowing to lie fallow.  It is traditionally fertilised with manure, nitrogen, phosphates, and potash.

Manure, nitrogen and Nitrate Vulnerable Zones (NVZ)

170 million tonnes of animal excreta ("slurry") is produced annually in the UK.  This slurry can pollute watercourses, draining them of oxygen, can contain pathogenic microorganisms such as salmonella, and creates an odour that causes complaints if stored near people.  Pigs and poultry in particular, which tend to be produced intensively on large holdings with a relatively small land area per animal, create manure that tends to be processed.  This is done either by removing the liquid component and transporting it away, or by composting it, or more recently, by anaerobic digestion to produce methane which is later converted to electricity.

Farmyard manure is among the best all-round soil fertilisers. Urine contains about half the nitrogen and most of the potash that an animal voids, but tends to drain away, making it both the richest and the most easily lost element of manure. Dung contains the other half of the nitrogen and most of the phosphoric acid and lime.  With dung, much of the nitrogen is lost in storage or locked up in slowly released forms, so greater quantities are necessary compared to artificial fertilisers.  Manure is most effective when ploughed into the fields while it is still fresh, but this is not practical while crops are growing and in practice, most manure is stored and then applied in winter, or else added in ridges for root crops.

Leguminous plants such as peas, beans or lucerne live in a symbiotic relationship with certain bacteria that produce nodules on their roots.  The bacteria extract nitrogen from the air and convert it to nitrogenating compounds that benefit the legume.  When the legume dies or is harvested, its rotting roots nitrogenate the soil. Nitrogen stimulates plant growth, but overapplication softens the plant tissues, makes them more vulnerable to pests and disease, and reduces resistance to frost. It may be added by nitrogen-fixing crops, but many farmers prefer artificial fertilisers, which are quicker. The negative side-effects of adding nitrogen are mitigated by phosphates.

Nitrogen from soil gets into the water, and can be hazardous to human health. EC Directive 80/778/EEC and 91/676/EEC both mention a ceiling acceptable level of nitrates of 50 mg/litre, which is also the level recommended by the World Health Organization.  In several places in Britain, particularly in the midlands and the south-east, nitrate concentrations occasionally exceed this level and the government has brought in regulations to control nitrate levels in the water. The regulations governing designated Nitrate Vulnerable Zones (NVZ) aim to protect ground and surface water from contamination with nitrates and manure. Around 68% of English farmland, 14% of Scottish farmland and all of Welsh farmland is within a NVZ. The NVZ rules control at what time of year farmers may apply nitrogen or manure to the land and oblige them to keep strict records of nitrogen-containing substances used.  They also regulate slurry and manure storage.

The Welsh Government introduced an all Wales NVZ in 2021.  Previously, 2.4% of Wales' land was designated as a NVZ. Environmental and fishing groups welcomed the new rules. It will be rolled out, pending a review by the Senedd, over the next three years. The review came after major political backlash from opposition parties and farmers.

Phosphates and potash
Phosphates are substances that contain phosphorus, which stimulates root development in young plants and is therefore particularly valuable for root crops. It also increases yields and speeds up plant growth generally. Phosphates are not easily lost from soil, but they mostly occur in very stable forms that are not liberated quickly enough by natural processes, so fertilisation is necessary. Traditionally, phosphate-bearing materials added to soil include bonemeal, powdered slag, and seaweed.

Potashes are substances that contain potassium which promotes disease resistance and helps to build starches and sugars.  Plants tend to absorb potash during early stages of growth, and potash tends to reduce the problems caused by applying nitrogen.  It also increases the weight of an individual cereal grain.  Traditional potash sources included applying ash to the land and ploughing in crop residues after the harvest. Artificial potash fertilisers were not used until deposits of potash salts were discovered in Germany in 1861.

Arable farming

Arable farming is the production of crops.  Crop growth is affected by light, soil, nutrients, water, air, and climate.  Crops commonly grown in the United Kingdom include cereals, chiefly wheat, oats and barley; root vegetables, chiefly potatoes and sugar beet; pulse crops such as beans or peas; forage crops such as cabbages, vetches, rape and kale; fruit, particularly apples and pears; and hay for animal feed.  From 1992 until 2004, or 2006 for organic farms, there were subsidies for not growing any crops at all.  This was called set-aside and resulted from EEC farming policies.  From 2007 onwards, set aside subsidies in the UK were withdrawn.

Seeds may be sown in spring, summer or autumn.  Spring-sown crops are vulnerable to drought in May or June.  Autumn sowing is usually restricted to frost-hardy types of bean, vetch, or cereal such as winter wheat. Traditional sowing techniques include broadcasting, dibbling, drilling, and ploughing in.  Drilling is normally the most economical technique where conditions are dry enough.

Climate change will have positive impacts on crop production in Ireland. The combined effects of higher  concentration, warmer spring/summer temperatures and lengthened growing season will all be beneficial to certain types of crop production, specifically grains and barley and detrimental to other crops, such as potatoes.

Cereal production statistics

In 2009,  of cereal crops were sown in the UK. Winter crops tend to be planted around mid-September, and spring crops as soon as the soil is ready. Each year the country produces about 6.5 million tonnes of barley, of which 1.5 million are exported, 2 million used in brewing and distilling activities and the remainder fed to livestock. The country also produces 14 to 15 million tons of wheat each year, of which farmers kept 3.9 million tonnes as stock in February 2012. In 2008, 750,000 tonnes of oats were produced, in 2011–2012 613,000.

During 1999–2003 production of barley ranged from 6,128,000 to 7,456,000, wheat from 11,580,000 to 16,704,000 and oats from 491,000 to 753,000.

Consumption
Consumption of oats by the human population compared with livestock is proportionally higher in the UK than in European countries, 455,000 tonnes as forecast by farm officials during 2012; with 163,000 tonnes fed to livestock during 2011–2012.

From 2002 to 2003, of the cereals grown, 31% of barley, 36% of oats and 34% of wheat were used for human consumption.

Methods

Ploughing is not always regarded as essential nowadays, but the plough can improve soil by inverting it to improve soil aeration and drainage, release nutrients through weathering, and expose harmful pests to predators.  It is also an effective method of weed control.  Ploughing depth in Britain varies between 5–6 inches in some limestone regions to up to 18 inches in deep stoneless silt land.  Most British ploughs are designed to turn a furrow of up to about a foot deep, which is relatively shallow compared to some other countries, where furrows of up to 16 inches are common.  Other machines used to prepare land include cultivators (to break up land too heavy for a normal plough), harrows (to level the surface of ploughed land), rolls or rollers (used for firming the soil), sprayers and dusters (used to spread herbicides, fungicides, insecticides and fertilisers).

Reaping is the process of harvesting a crop.  Traditionally reaping was done with the scythe and reaping hook, but in Britain these have been entirely superseded by machinery. Combine harvesters, so called because they both harvest and thresh the crop, are common.  Other machines used include mowers, reapers, binders, harvesters, pea cutters and flax pullers.  Once reaped, some crops are brought directly to market.  Others need to be threshed to separate the cash crop from the straw and chaff.  Wheat, oats, barley, beans and some kinds of small seed (e.g. clover) typically need to be threshed.

Since the Second World War, scientific and technical progress and the removal of tenancy-based restrictions on choice of crop have given British arable farmers a great deal more freedom to plan cropping sequences.  Strict crop rotation is no longer technically necessary or even financially desirable.  Factors that influence crop sequences include the soil type, weather, the price and availability of labour and power, market outlets, and technical considerations about maintaining soil fertility and crop health.  For example, some vigorous crops such as kale or arable silage will, when liberally fertilised, tend to outgrow and smother weeds.  Many pests and diseases are crop-specific and the more often a particular crop is taken, the greater the buildup of pests and diseases that attack it.  The farmer will therefore try to design a sequence to sustain high yields, permit adequate weed control, service market needs, and keep the soil free from diseases and pests.

As a direct result of climate change, harvesting is coming earlier in the year. The increased temperatures and  levels allow this to happen. This means crops can be harvested well in advance of the heavy rain season.

Diseases
Most diseases of crop plants result from fungus spores that may live in the soil and enter through roots, be airborne and enter the plant through damaged areas or landing on leaf surfaces, or are spread by pests.  These spores tend to affect photosynthesis and reduce chlorophyll.  They often make plants look yellow and affect growth and marketability of the crop.  They are most commonly treated with fungicides, and may be called mildews, rusts, blotches, scabs, wilts, rots or blights.  European Union regulations on pesticides are changing, and several important pesticides currently in use will no longer be available.  This has potentially quite serious implications for British agriculture.

Climate change is bringing with it the earlier onset of winter rain. These very wet soils during spring time will also lead to unwanted pest and disease problems during the plating season.

Two of the most serious diseases currently affecting crop plants are colony collapse disorder (CCD), a somewhat mysterious effect that is wiping out honeybee colonies worldwide, and varroa destructor, a parasitic mite that also affects honeybees and may be a contributor to CCD.  Honeybees pollinate 80% of plants worldwide. In 2007, up to 80% of the bee colonies in some areas were wiped out.  Honeybees pollinate crops worth about £200 million a year, and their total contribution to the economy may be as high as £1 billion.

Weeds

Historically weed control was by hand-pulling of weeds, often during "fallowing" (which means leaving the land to carry no crop for a season, during which time the weeds can be found and removed).  In 1896 it was found that a copper sulphate solution would kill broad-leaved weeds without seriously damaging young cereal plants.  Other chemical weedkillers were soon discovered and now common chemical weedkiller ingredients include sodium chlorate, copper chloride, sulphuric acid, dinitroorthocresol and dinitrobutylphenol.  Hormone-based weedkillers are used to kill weeds more selectively.  Although most weeds are vulnerable to at least one of these substances, eradicating all the weeds from a particular area will usually need several different weedkillers. The use of pesticides has declined, and British farmers now use about a third less pesticides than they did in 1983. The crop needing most pesticides is wheat.

Pests
A pest is an animal that eats or spoils food meant for humans. Pests damage crops by removing leaf area, severing roots, or simply gross damage.  In the UK, they comprise invertebrates (chiefly nematodes, slugs and insects or insect larvae), mammals (particularly rabbits) and birds (mainly members of the pigeon family).  The damage caused by crop pests is considerable.  For example, potato cyst nematodes cause over £50 million damage a year in the UK.

Pastoral farming

Pastoral farming is the breeding of livestock for meat, wool, eggs and milk, and historically (in the UK) for labour.  Livestock products are the main element of the UK's agricultural output. The most common meat animals in the United Kingdom are cattle, pigs, sheep and poultry.  Overwhelmingly, British wool comes from sheep, with only a few goats or alpacas bred for exotic wools such as cashmere or angora.  The vast majority of milk comes from cattle, and eggs from chickens.

Most British farm animals are bred for a particular purpose, so for example, there is a sharp division between cattle bred for the beef trade—early-maturing cattle are best to increase yield, and those that store fat marbled within the muscle rather than as layers outside are preferred for the flavour—and those bred for dairy, where animals with a high milk yield are strongly preferred.  Nevertheless, because dairy cattle must calve to produce milk, much of the British beef output is from surplus dairy herd calves.

Cattle farming

There are about 17,000 dairy farms in the UK, largely in the west.  Average herd size is 86 cows in England, 75 in Wales and 102 in Scotland.  Most cows are milked twice a day, and an average dairy cow yields 6,300 litres a year. The most important dairy cattle breed is the ubiquitous British Friesian, which has largely replaced the Dairy Shorthorn in British dairy herds thanks both to its high milk yield and the relatively high quality of the beef it produces.

The UK once produced roughly as much beef as it ate, but this changed in 1996 because of bovine spongiform encephalopathy (BSE).  The BSE crisis led to regulations preventing animals more than 30 months old from entering the food chain, which meant cull cows could no longer be sold for beef. Just under 6 million cattle over this age were destroyed.  A Calf Purchase Aid Scheme, under which a further nearly 2 million calves were slaughtered, ended in 1999. In 2002, the UK produced 72% of the beef it ate.  Important beef cattle breeds include the Hereford, which is the most popular British beef breed, and the Aberdeen Angus.  The once-widespread Beef Shorthorn is now a relatively uncommon sight.

Cows require significant areas of grassland to raise.  Dairy cows need 0.4 to 0.5 hectares per cow, including the area needed for winter silage; suckler beef cows can need up to a whole hectare each.  The UK produces very little veal, and UK law requires that animals are kept in daylight in groups with bedding and access to hay, silage or straw.  This produces "pink" veal which grows more slowly and is less desirable to the continental customer.

Sheep farming
Over 41,000 farms in the UK produce sheep, but more than half of breeding ewes are on hill or upland farms suitable for little else. National Parks and heather moors such as the Lake District, the Pennines and Snowdonia in Wales are dominated by sheep farms, as are the Scottish Highlands.  In the lowlands, pockets of sheep farms remain. Romney Marsh (which gave its name to the Romney sheep) and The Downs in Kent are famous for their sheep. Sheep farming in Wales encompasses both upland and lowland areas.

The number of sheep farmed in the UK peaked in 1998 at 20.3 million, as a result of the Sheepmeat Regime, a relatively generous EU support initiative first begun in 1980.  Numbers declined following the 2001 outbreak of foot and mouth, and the UK temporarily lost its place as Europe's largest producer of lamb, although this was recovered later.  (Although it is Europe's largest producer, the UK is nevertheless a net importer of lamb, often from New Zealand.)

Nowadays many ewes are housed indoors for lambing, which costs more but facilitates earlier lambing with lower mortality and replacement rates.  It also rests and protects the grassland, leading to better early growth and higher stocking rates.  Sheep are also important in helping to manage the landscape.  Their trampling hinders bracken spread and prevents heather moor from reverting to scrub woodland.  Wool production is no longer economically important in the UK, and nowadays, sheared fleeces are often treated as a waste product.

Pig farming

Pig farming is concentrated in Yorkshire and East Anglia. About 4,600 farms produce pigs, and the UK is 90% self-sufficient in pork, but only about 40% self-sufficient in bacon and ham, which reflects a traditional British preference for these cuts. Nowadays many pig farms in the UK breed intensively farmed hybrids of types like the Large White, British Landrace, Welsh or British Saddleback, and formerly popular breeds like the Cumberland and Small White are extinct. Wild boar are sometimes farmed.  They are currently covered under the Dangerous Wild Animals Act 1976 and farmers need permission from their local authority to keep them.

The UK pig herd is declining, and there are now some individual pig farms in the US that have more sows than there are in the UK as a whole. Pigs often used to be kept indoors throughout their lives, but welfare concerns and increased costs have led to more outdoor units, and by 2002 30% of sows were outdoors.  In many countries sows are kept tethered in individual stalls, but this system was banned in the UK in 1999 on animal welfare grounds.  Indoor sows are housed in groups.  Each sow produces an average of 24 piglets a year and will be pregnant or lactating for 340 days a year.  This intensive production wears the sows out, and about 40% of them need to be replaced each year.

A major byproduct of pig production is slurry.  One sow and her piglets can produce ten tonnes of slurry a year.  Because regulations limit how much slurry can be loaded onto a given area of land, this means that each sow with her progeny will manure at least 0.8 hectares.  This is a problem because pig manure is mildly toxic, owing to the use of copper as a growth enhancer.

Other livestock and poultry
The UK has about 73,000 goats, mostly as milk producers; this number is relatively small by EU standards.  Venison production in the UK is mainly from red deer, with a few fallow deer as well, but there are only about 300 venison-producing farms. As noted above, there are about 26,500 farms with chickens.  However, more than half the UK's eggs come from fewer than 400 flocks, mostly with more than 50,000 birds each.  Other livestock and poultry farmed on a smaller scale include game birds, ducks, geese, turkeys, ostriches and rabbits. In this way, the UK produce annually 22 million turkeys.

Livestock movement and record-keeping
Farmers wanting to move their livestock outside their own farms must obey the Disease Control (England) Order 2003, the Disease Control (Wales) Order 2003 or the Disease Control (Interim Measures) (Scotland) Order 2002, as applicable.  This means a farmer needs a licence from the Local Authority to move livestock.  There are also minimum "standstill" periods once livestock has been moved, so for example, a farmer buying new cattle and moving them onto his farm must then wait six days before taking other cattle to market.  Most livestock must be identified.  Each individual cow must have a "passport" issued by the British Cattle Movement Service. Other farm animals such as sheep, goats or pigs must have a herd mark.

Disease
Designated notifiable diseases under the Diseases of Animals Act include anthrax, foot-and-mouth disease, fowl pest, bovine tuberculosis, BSE, scrapie, swine vesicular disease, Aujeszky's disease, bovine leukemia virus, rabies and warble fly.  Under the Zoonoses Order conditions that can be transmitted to humans, such as brucellosis or salmonella, must also be notified.

The United Kingdom suffered outbreaks of foot-and-mouth disease in 1967 and 2001, with a less serious outbreak in 2007.  There was also an outbreak of bluetongue in 2007. The most serious disease to affect British agriculture was BSE, a cattle brain disease that causes a similar disease in some humans who eat infected meat.  It has killed 166 people in Britain since 1994.

A current issue is the control of bovine tuberculosis, which can also be carried by badgers.  It is alleged that the badgers are infecting the cows.  A scientific report for the government recommended a selective cull of badgers, which immediately met with opposition from other scientists. The government is currently consulting on this issue. As of 16 September 2011, a total of 27 online petitions had attracted 65,000 signatures opposing the plan.

Animal welfare

Animal welfare legislation affecting UK agriculture includes the Animal Welfare Act 2006, the Welfare of Farmed Animals Regulations 2007 and the Welfare of Animals (Transport) Order 1997.  The UK has a good reputation for animal welfare, and there are several codes of practice.

Animal welfare as an issue is increasingly important to the European Union. Although welfare-conscious husbandry can have economic benefits to the farmer, because a happy animal puts on weight more rapidly and will reproduce more easily, the mere fact that an animal is gaining weight or reproducing does not necessarily indicate a high level of animal welfare. Generally there is a tension between the minimum acceptable level of animal welfare for the consumer, the price of the product, and an acceptable margin for the farmer.  This tension is resolved by food labelling that enables the consumer to select the price they are prepared to pay for a given level of animal welfare.  So for example, many consumers prefer to buy free range eggs even where these are more expensive than eggs from battery hens.  Nowadays, there are various welfare assurance schemes in response to consumer pressure. The use of battery cages in now illegal in the European Union, due to the severe impacts the cages can have on the well-being of hens.

Current issues in British agriculture

Organic farming

Organic farming is farming without chemical fertilisers, most pesticides, genetic modification, or the routine use of drugs, antibiotics or wormers.  In the United Kingdom it is supported and encouraged by the Soil Association.  The Food Standards Agency says that organic food offers no additional nutritional benefits over the non-organic kind, though the Soil Association disputes this. However, there are definite benefits in terms of on-farm conservation and wildlife. In the UK as in most of northern Europe, organic crop yields can be 40%–50% lower than conventional, more intensive farming and labour use can be 10%–25% higher.

The Organic Aid Scheme egg came into effect in 1994, providing grants to fund farmers wishing to convert to organic farming. By the end of 1997 about  had been converted under the scheme, at a cost of £750,000. The global market for organic food is worth £1.2 billion a year and is increasing. The UK's share of the European organic farming market is about 10%.

Biofuel

Biofuels are fuels derived from biomass.  They can be used in their pure form to power vehicles, but most commonly they are blended with traditional fuels such as diesel.  In 2003, the European Union saw biofuels as an answer to several problems: climate change, energy security and stimulating the rural economy, and agreed the Biofuels Directive to see that production was kickstarted.  In 2008, the Gallagher Review expressed concern about the effects of the biofuels initiative and identified the conversion of agricultural land to biofuels production as a factor in rising food prices.  The current recommended option is that farmers should use marginal or waste land to produce biofuels and maintain production of food on prime agricultural land.

The Renewable Transport Fuel Obligation ("RTFO") obliges fuel suppliers to see that a certain proportion of the fuel they sell comes from renewable sources.  The target for 2009/10 is 3.25% by volume. This presents a potentially useful source of revenue for some farmers.

Biofuel crops grown in the UK include oilseed rape (which is also grown for other purposes), short-rotation coppices such as poplar or willow, and miscanthus.  Unfortunately biofuels are quite bulky for their energy yield, which means processing into fuel needs to happen near where the crop is grown; otherwise, most or all of the benefit of biofuels can be lost in transporting the biofuel to the processing area.  Such local processing units are not generally available in the UK, and further expansion of this market will depend on politics and industrial finance.

Diversification
About half of all farmers in the United Kingdom supplement their income through diversification. On average diversification adds £10,400 to a farm's revenue.

Since time immemorial, sporting rights over farmland for hunting or trapping game have had commercial value; nowadays, game shooting, deer stalking and fishing are important features within the UK economy. Fox hunting previously went on, but has been banned in the United Kingdom since February 2005.

There are a huge number of ways of diversifying. Farmland may, for example, be converted to equestrian facilities, amenity parkland, country clubs, hotels, golf courses, camping and caravan sites. Farmers open shops, restaurants and even pubs to sell their products. The Farm Diversification Benchmarking Study, which was commissioned by DEFRA and carried out by Exeter University in conjunction with the University of Plymouth, found that 65% of full-time farming businesses had diversified, but in the June census of the preceding year (2003), the estimate was 19% of full-time farming businesses. The large discrepancy is probably because the census data excluded the letting or subletting of buildings. The most common kinds of diversification are probably letting of barns as warehouses and storage, letting of former farm labourers' cottages (whether as holiday cottages or on longer leases) and farm shops. The number of farm shops in the UK increased by more than 50% between 1999 and 2003.

There is grant funding available for diversification schemes, as well as other initiatives to improve competitiveness in the farming sector, through the Rural Development Programme for England.  The scheme runs until 2013, is managed through Defra and has been delivered to date through Regional Development Agencies. Expenditure on the Rural Development Programme for England will remain around £3.7 billion for the 2007–13 programme period, compared with the original planned budget of about £3.9 billion.

Custodianship

It was first suggested that farmers could be paid for "producing countryside" in 1969, but the real beginning of positive agri-environmental policy came with the Agriculture Act 1986.  The Countryside Stewardship Scheme and local equivalents were run by the Countryside Commission and the Countryside Council for Wales from 1991 until 1996, when they came under ministry control.  Nowadays schemes to encourage farmers to think about wildlife conservation and to farm in an environmentally friendly way abound, though actual payments to farmers to support this are comparatively modest.

When EU subsidy regime changes in 2013, farmers will receive a greater proportion of their payments from "management of natural resources and climate action." This forms one of the three "principal objectives" of the reformed Common Agricultural Policy which is under consultation until March 2012.

Barriers to entry
In the 1930s land with vacant possession cost an average of £60 per hectare. In 1996 it cost £8,795 per hectare. In the same period retail prices rose by a factor of 35, but agricultural land prices rose by a factor of well over 100. The most extreme change was in 1972, during which year the price per acre more than doubled. Today farming land remains scarce and much in demand, and the market continues to rise. Thus the only option for someone who lacks capital for land purchase but wants to farm is to rent land as a tenant farmer. Rents increased by 24% in the year to 25 March 2011. The average across all farms in England, Wales and Scotland is now £70/acre, up from £57/acre; dairy farms cost £80 per acre on average, and arable farms now cost £99 per acre.

Historically tenant farmers, as peasants or villeins, had been exploited and starting in 1875, successive governments enacted legislation to protect them. This trend culminated in the Agricultural Holdings Act 1986, which consolidated and built on a century-long trend in the law. This Act was so onerous towards landlords that they were reluctant to let land. It became so hard to obtain a tenancy that the farming industry supported reform, which was enacted in the Agricultural Tenancies Act 1995. Nowadays most new tenancies in England and Wales are Farm Business Tenancies under the 1995 Act, but the 1986 Act tenancies that are still in force may allow for succession, and can sometimes be passed down through up to two generations of tenant. The most common route of entry into farming is to succeed to a holding, whether as owner or tenant, so a person's ability to farm is often determined by their family background rather than their skills or qualifications.

Public sector food procurement
It is an objective of public procurement in the UK "to support our agricultural industry", at the same time as "providing value for money within public procurement".

County farms
Local government authorities have powers under the Smallholdings and Allotments Act to buy and rent land to people who want to become farmers. Fifty County Councils and Unitary Authorities in England and Wales offer tenancies on smallholdings (called "County Farms") as an entry route into agriculture, but this provision is shrinking. The number of tenants on these smallholdings shrank by 58% in the same period to about 2,900. County Farms yielded an operational surplus of £10.6 million to local authorities in the financial year 2008–9. Some local authorities dispose of County Farms to obtain capital receipts. Somerset County Council proposes to sell 35 of its 62 County Farms.

See also

 Agriculture in Scotland
 Agriculture in Wales
 Agriculture in Ireland
 Aquaculture in the United Kingdom
 Beekeeping in the United Kingdom
 Forestry in the United Kingdom
 English land law
 List of renewable resources produced and traded by the United Kingdom

Notes

Citations

References

Bibliography

 
 
 , see also

Historical
 Allen, Robert C. "English and Welsh agriculture, 1300–1850: outputs, inputs, and income." (2006). online
 Allen, Robert C. (1994). "Agriculture During the Industrial Revolution," in The Economic History of Britain since 1700, Vol. I: 1700–1860, ed. by Roderick Floud and Donald McCloskey, pp. 96–122.
also in Roderick Floud, Jane Humphries, and Paul Johnson, eds. The Cambridge Economic History of Modern Britain (2014); vol 1 pp 96–116.
 Campbell, Bruce M.S. and Overton, Mark. (1991). "A New Perspective on Medieval and Early Modern Agriculture: Six Centuries of Norfolk Farming c. 1250–1850," Past & Present #141, pp. 38–105.
 Clapham, Sir John. A concise economic history of Britain: from the earliest times to 1750 (1949), passim.
 Coleman, D. C. The Economy of England, 1450–1750 (1977), pp. 31–47, 111–130.
 Daunton, M. J. Progress and poverty: an economic and social history of Britain 1700–1850 (1995), pp. 25–121.
 Ernle, Lord. English Farming: Past and Present (Heinemann, 1961).
 Floud, Roderick, and Paul Johnson, eds. The Cambridge Economic History of Modern Britain: Volume 1, Industrialisation, 1700–1870 (2004) pp 96–116.
 Hoyle, Richard W., ed. The Farmer in England, 1650–1980 (Ashgate Publishing, 2013)
 Hopcroft, Rosemary L. "The social origins of agrarian change in late medieval England." American journal of sociology (1994): 1559–1595. in JSTOR
 Kussmaul, Ann. Servants in husbandry in early modern England (Cambridge University Press, 1981)
 Langdon, John (1982). "The Economics of Horses and Oxen in Medieval England," Agricultural History Review, Vol. 30, pp. 31–40.
 Langdon, John. Horses, oxen and technological innovation: the use of draught animals in English farming from 1066–1500 (Cambridge University Press, 2002)
 Martins, Susanna Wade. Farmers, landlords and landscapes: rural Britain, 1720 to 1870 (Windgather Pr, 2004)
 May, Trevor. An economic and social history of Britain, 1760–1970 (2nd ed. 1995), passim
 Orwin, C. S. A History of English Farming (1949), 153pp online
 Overton, Mark. The Agricultural Revolution: The Transformation of the Agrarian Economy: 1500–1850 (Cambridge University Press. 1996)
 Overton, Mark: Agricultural Revolution in England 1500–1850, BBC, last updated 5 November 2009. Retrieved 17 June 2010.
 Rule, John. The vital century: England's developing economy 1714–1815 (1992) pp. 39–92. 
 Taylor, David. Mastering economic and social history (1988), textbook chapters 2, 23. 
 Thirsk, Joan, ed. The agrarian history of England and Wales (8 vol 1978) to 1939; the standard scholarly history; highly detailed
 Thomas, Richard, Matilda Holmes, and James Morris. ""So bigge as bigge may be": tracking size and shape change in domestic livestock in London (AD 1220–1900)." Journal of Archaeological Science  40.8 (2013): 3309–3325. online
 Woolgar, C.M., Serjeantson, D., Waldron, T. (Eds.), Food in Medieval England (Oxford University Press, 2006)

Primary sources
 Clapp, B.W. ed. Documents in English Economic History: England since 1760 (1976).

Periodicals

 Agricultural History Review, quarterly since 1953.
 The Economic History Review, quarterly since 1927.
 King, Jane (ed.): Farmers Weekly. Sutton, Surrey: Reed Business Information.  .
 King, Richard (ed): Agricultural Budgeting and Costing Book ("ABC").  Melton Mowbray: Agro Business Consultants.  .
 Parliamentary Office of Science and Technology: Postnote, June 2009, No. 336: "Crop Protection".

External links

 Department for Environment Food and Rural Affairs (DEFRA)
 UK government website on food and agricultural production, official website
 National Statistics, Agriculture in the UK, official website